The 1957 Middle Tennessee Blue Raiders football team represented the Middle Tennessee State College—now known as Middle Tennessee State University—as a member of the Ohio Valley Conference (OVC) during the 1957 NCAA College Division football season. Led by 11-year head coach Charles M. Murphy, the Blue Raiders compiled a record an overall record of 10–0 with a mark of 5–0 in conference play, winning the OVC title. The team's captains were B. Rolman and R. Massey.

Schedule

References

Middle Tennessee
Middle Tennessee Blue Raiders football seasons
Ohio Valley Conference football champion seasons
College football undefeated seasons
Middle Tennessee Blue Raiders football